Pieces of Dreams is a 1970 drama film, produced in the United States. It was directed by Daniel Haller and is based on the 1968 novel The Wine and the Music by William Edmund Barrett. The story follows the internal struggle of Father Gregory Lind, a Catholic priest who falls in love and starts to question his relationship with the Church.

Plot
Father Gregory Lind (Robert Forster), is a Catholic priest struggling with his life in the priesthood. He wishes to change parishes, but is denied the transfer time after time. The story starts with him arriving at the local hospital after being informed that one of his charges is dying after trying to steal a car. He meets there Pamela Gibson (Lauren Hutton) – a widowed and rich social worker from the local Community Center. Together they decide to find out more about the deceased teen. The pair checks up on Estella Rios (Kathy Baca), the boy's pregnant, underage girlfriend. They don't agree on what should be done about her and later Father Lind finds out from Mrs. Rios (Miriam Martinez) that Pamela took Estalla to probably get an abortion. This leads to more arguments between the two, but they lose importance when the girl ends up in a hospital and miscarries. The social worker breaks down and Father Lind ends up having sex with her, after taking her back home.

To forget the act and the woman, he spends some time away from her, but in the end goes back to Pamela and they go on a romantic weekend in the mountains. To clear up his confusing feelings about his love for the widow and priesthood, Father Lind visits his family, hoping for support. He receives none from his mother (Edith Atwater) when he informs her about his wish to leave the life of a priest, and is forbidden by her from doing so. Feeling angry and betrayed, he takes a vacation and goes to work in a hospital in Santa Fe. Unknown to him, one of the priests from his parish pays a visit to Pamela to force her to leave Father Lind alone, accusing her of trying to destroy his future. The social worker disagrees and goes to see the priest, but they end up in another argument, when the woman forces him to choose between his love for her and priesthood. After spending some time back at his parish in Albuquerque and thinking, Father Lind visits the Bishop (Will Geer), to inform him about his wish to leave the priesthood, because he is in love. The Bishop is unable to change his mind. Father Lind, no longer a priest, goes then to see Pamela and tell her that he chooses her and they end up staying together.

Cast
 Robert Forster as Fr. Gregory Lind
 Lauren Hutton as Pamela Gibson
 Will Geer as Bishop
 Ivor Francis as Fr. Paul Schaeffer
 Richard O'Brien as Mons. Francis Hurley
 Edith Atwater as Mrs. Lind
 Mitzi Hoag as Anne Lind
 Rudy Diaz as Sgt. Bill Walkingstick
 Sam Javis as Leo Rose
 Gail Bonney as Mrs. Tietgens
 Helen Westcott as Mrs. Straub
 Joanne Moore Jordan as Bar Girl
 Miriam Martinez as Mrs. Rios
 Kathy Baca as Estella Rios
 Eloy Casados as Charlie, the Jailed Boy
 Raimundo Baca as Gunshot Victim
 Robert McCoy as Employment Agency Interviewer

Release and reception

US rating
The film was rated PG in United States. The rating has been changed to PG-13 for thematic elements, sexual material and some language in 2011.

Home media
The film was released on DVD on March 12, 2012.

Accolades

See also
 List of American films of 1970

References

Future reading
 Hanson. Peter. 29 March 2012. Pieces Of Dreams. Blogger.
 Lukeman. William. 18 August 2012. Pieces Of Dreams: Stuck between pretty & girtty. Amazon.

External links
 

1970 films
1970 romantic drama films
American romantic drama films
Films about Catholic priests
Films based on American novels
Films directed by Daniel Haller
Films scored by Michel Legrand
Films set in New Mexico
Films shot in New Mexico
United Artists films
1970s English-language films
1970s American films